Leaving Eden is the fourth studio album by the Carolina Chocolate Drops.

Background
A music video for "Country Girl" was released in May 2012.

Track listing
"Riro's House" (Traditional; arr. Dom Flemons, Rhiannon Giddens) – 2:02
"Kerr's Negro Jig" (Traditional; arr. Giddens) – 1:09
"Ruby, Are You Mad at Your Man?" (Cousin Emmy) – 3:46
"Boodle-De-Bum-Bum" (Ben Curry/Traditional; arr. Flemons) – 4:03
"Country Girl" (Giddens, Lalenja Harrington, Adam Matta) – 3:22
"Run Mountain" (J. E. Mainer) – 2:01
"Leaving Eden" (Laurelyn Dossett) – 4:36
"Read 'Em John" (Traditional; arr. Flemons) – 1:54
"Mahalla" (Hannes Coetzee) – 1:54
"West End Blues" (Etta Baker, Giddens) – 3:02
"Po’ Black Sheep" (Traditional; arr. Flemons) – 3:21
"I Truly Understand That You Love Another Man" (George Roarke) – 2:34
"No Man’s Mama" (Lew Pollack, Jack Yellen) – 4:00
"Briggs’ Corn Shucking Jig / Camptown Hornpipe" (Traditional; arr. Giddens) – 2:54
"Pretty Bird" (Hazel Dickens) – 4:04

Bonus track
"You Be Illin'" (Joseph Simmons, Darryl McDaniels, Raymond White) – 3:17

Personnel
Dom Flemons – snare drum, bass drum, bones, 4-string banjo, jug, quills, guitar
Rhiannon Giddens – fiddle, 5-strings gourd banjo, 5 string banjo, 5-string cello banjo 
Hubby Jenkins – 5-string banjo, mandolin, guitar, bones
Adam Matta – beatbox, tambourine
Leyla McCalla – cello

Charts

Weekly

Year-end

References

External links
Leaving Eden on Nonesuch

The Carolina Chocolate Drops albums
Nonesuch Records albums
Culture of Durham, North Carolina
Albums produced by Buddy Miller